Capstone is a publisher of children’s books and digital products. Capstone focuses on the educational market. They also sell to the trade market and internationally. Capstone publishes nonfiction, fiction, picture books, interactive books, audio books, literacy programs, and digital media. Imprints and divisions include Capstone Press, Compass Point Books, Picture Window Books, Stone Arch Books, Red Brick Learning, Capstone Digital, Heinemann-Raintree and Switch Press. Capstone acquired the assets of Heinemann-Raintree library reference from Pearson Education in 2008. Heinemann-Raintree has offices in Chicago and Oxford, England. Capstone is based in Mankato, Minnesota, with additional offices in Minneapolis, Chicago, and Oxford. Capstone is part of Coughlan Companies, Inc. Coughlan Companies also includes Jordan Sands, a limestone quarry, and fabrication facility.

History
 1990 Capstone Press acquired
 1991 Capstone Press first titles released
 1998 Pebble brand created
 1999 Capstone creates their first imprint, Compass Point Books
 2001 Capstone creates their second imprint, Picture Window Books
 2002 Red Brick Learning Launched
 2003 FactHound.com Launched
 2004 Pebble Plus launched
 2005 Capstone creates their third imprint, Stone Arch Books
 2007 Capstone Publishers (Capstone) established to unite imprints
 2007 Capstone Interactive Library Launched 
 2008 Capstone acquired Heinemann Global Library
 2008 Capstone Launched CollectionWiz
 2009 PebbleGo Launched 
 2009 Capstone Digital Launched
 2010 PebbleGo Earth and Science Launched

Imprints
Capstone imprints contain fiction and nonfiction titles.  Capstone also has digital products (myON, Capstone Interactive Library, CapstoneKids FactHound and PebbleGo) and services (CollectionWiz and Library Processing).
Capstone Press – publishes nonfiction for grades preK-8.
Compass Point Books – publishes nonfiction with a focus on topics such as history, science, biography and careers, grades 5-12.
Picture Window Books – publishes fiction and nonfiction easy readers, picture books and chapter books, grades preK-4.
Stone Arch Books – publishes fiction for grades K–9.
Switch Press – publishes nonfiction, cookbooks, craft and how-to titles, and narrative nonfiction. Historical fiction, fantasy, graphic novels, and poetry for young adult reads.

References

External links
 Capstone website
Switch Press website

Companies based in Minnesota
Book publishing companies based in Minnesota
Publishing companies established in 1990
Mankato, Minnesota
1990 establishments in Minnesota